Malice in the Palace was a professional wrestling event that was filmed on October 19, 2007 at the Cow Palace in Daly City, California. The event was filmed for broadcast and DVD release by Big Vision Entertainment.

The event was free to attendees of the weekend-long WrestleFanFest convention. The convention was also slated to host a Mixed Martial Arts event the following night, but it was canceled by the California State Athletic Commission due to the caged enclosure missing two required support beams

The originally announced card featured wrestlers that did not end up appearing, including Goldberg, The Outsiders, Sid Vicious, Andrew Martin, Mil Máscaras, Kevin Sullivan, Dan Severn and Marty Jannetty.

Results

References

External links
WrestleFanFest.com - Malice in the Palace - Official website

Professional wrestling shows
2007 in professional wrestling
Events in California
2007 in California
Professional wrestling in California